Second Presbyterian Church is a historic Presbyterian church located at 5 N. 5th Street in Richmond, Virginia.  It was designed by architect Minard Lafever and was built in 1848.  It is a brick veneer Gothic Revival style church with lancet windows and a square pinnacled tower with an arched entrance at the front of the church.

It was listed on the National Register of Historic Places in 1972.

References

Churches on the National Register of Historic Places in Virginia
19th-century Presbyterian church buildings in the United States
Presbyterian churches in Virginia
Churches in Richmond, Virginia
National Register of Historic Places in Richmond, Virginia
Gothic Revival church buildings in Virginia
Churches completed in 1848